Cabinet of Beata Szydło formed the 17th government of Poland, until 11 December 2017. Governing during the 8th legislature of the Sejm and the 9th legislature of the Senate, it was led by Beata Szydło.

On 7 April 2017 the government survived a motion of no confidence entered by the opposition, which was rejected with 174 ayes, 238 nays and four abstentions.

Members of the Council of Ministers

References

External links
 Government composition

Szydlo, Beata
History of Poland (1989–present)
Law and Justice
2015 establishments in Poland
Cabinets established in 2015